Christoph Lütge (born 10 November 1969) is a German philosopher and economist notable for his work on business ethics, AI ethics, experimental ethics and political philosophy. He is full professor of business ethics at the Technical University of Munich and director of its Institute for Ethics in Artificial Intelligence.

Academic career
After studying philosophy and business informatics in Braunschweig, Göttingen and Paris, Lütge was a PhD student at Technical University of Berlin and Braunschweig University of Technology from 1997 to 1999. He was a visiting scholar at the University of Pittsburgh in 1997 and research fellow at the University of California, San Diego in 1998. In 1999, he received his doctorate in philosophy and became a research assistant at Ludwig Maximilian University of Munich. He was visiting professor at Venice International University in 2003. From 2004, Lütge was assistant professor at the department of philosophy of Ludwig Maximilian University of Munich, from which he also received his habilitation in 2005. Christoph Lütge was acting professor at Witten/Herdecke University from 2007 to 2008 and at Braunschweig University of Technology from 2008 to 2010. Since August 2010, he holds the newly created Peter Löscher Endowed Chair of Business Ethics at Technical University of Munich. In 2019, Lütge became director of the new Institute for Ethics in Artificial Intelligence (IEAI) at Technical University of Munich. Facebook made a five-year contribution to TUM (with US$7.5 million. ) in January 2019, to help launch the IEAI, which will finance, and ensure the independence of, game-changing research into wide-reaching, ethical and responsible applications for AI.

Philosophy

Business ethics
In his work on business ethics, Lütge advocates a contractarian approach termed „order ethics“. This approach focuses on the institutional and order framework of a society and its economy. Both formal and informal order elements are analyzed in order ethics, which especially highlights the relation of competition and ethics and reaches out into thematic fields such as Corporate Social Responsibility and Diversity.

Political philosophy
In his work on political philosophy, „Order Ethics or Moral Surplus: What Holds a Society Together?“, Lütge takes on a fundamental problem of contemporary political philosophy and ethics. He questions the often implicit assumption of many contemporary political philosophers according to which a society needs its citizens to adopt some shared basic qualities, views or capabilities (here termed a moral surplus). Lütge examines the respective theories of, among others, Jürgen Habermas, John Rawls, David Gauthier, James M. Buchanan, and Kenneth Binmore with a focus on their respective moral surpluses. He finds that each moral surplus is either not necessary for the stability of societies or cannot remain stable when faced with opposing incentives. Binmore’s idea of empathy is the only one that is, at least partly, not confronted with this dilemma. Lütge provides an alternative view termed "order ethics", which weakens the necessary assumptions for modern societies and basically only relies on mutual advantages as the fundamental basis of society.

Distinctions and awards
In 2007, Lütge received a Heisenberg Fellowship from the German Research Foundation. In the past, he has been a Member of the Senate and the Advisory Council of the Bavarian School of Public Policy, as well as a Member of the Ethics Advisory Board of the European Medical Information Framework (EMIF), Member of the Advisory Board of the Centre for Governance, Leadership and Global Responsibility of Leeds Metropolitan University and Vice chairman of the audit committee of the Bavarian Construction Industry Association. Among others, Lütge has held visiting positions at the Berkman Klein Center for Internet and Society of Harvard University (2019), National Taipei University (2015) and Kyoto (2015). In 2016, he was appointed by Federal Minister of Transport and Digital Infrastructure Alexander Dobrindt to serve on the German government’s Ethics Commission on Autonomous Driving. In 2017, Lütge was elected into the Executive Committee of the International Society for Business, Ethics and Economics (ISBEE). From 2018 to 2020, he was Liaison Professor of the Studienstiftung des deutschen Volkes (German Academic Scholarship Foundation) and, since 2018, Member of the Scientific Board of AI4People. Since 2019, Lütge is appointed as External Member of the Karel Čapek Center for Values in Science and Technology (Czech Academy of Sciences, Prague). Since 2021, he is also a member of the Academic Committee of the Institute for AI International Governance of Tsinghua University.

Academic bodies reviewer 
Lütge has done reviewing work for the Royal Swedish Academy of Sciences, Netherlands Organization for Scientific Research, Israel Science Foundation, Swiss National Science Foundation, German Research Foundation (DFG), German Council of Science and Humanities (Wissenschaftsrat), Society for Business Ethics, German National Academic Foundation, German Academic Exchange Service (DAAD) and German Federal Environmental Foundation.

Research interests 

 Business Ethics
 Ethics of Digital Technologies (AI, Autonomous Driving)
 Ethics of Technology
 Experimental Ethics
 Corporate Social Responsibility
 Foundations of Ethics
 Contractualist Ethics
 Ethics and Risk
 Philosophy of Science
 Philosophy of Music

Controversy 
He was dismissed from the Bavarian Ethics Council. According to the Council's chair, Lütge had been evoking the impression that his personal opinion had been authorized by the Council. Lütge has rejected this claim in interviews.

Major books
 Business Ethics: An Economically Informed Perspective, Oxford University Press, Oxford 2021 (with Matthias Uhl), .
 An Introduction to Ethics in Robotics and AI, Dordrecht: Springer, 2021, (ed. with C. Bartneck, A. Wagner and S. Welsh), . Free OpenAccess download here: https://link.springer.com/book/10.1007/978-3-030-51110-4
 The Praxis of Diversity, Basingstoke: Macmillan 2020, (ed., with C. Lütge, and M. Faltermeier), .
 Ethik in KI und Robotik,  Munich: Hanser Verlag, 2019, (ed. with C. Bartneck, A. Wagner and S. Welsh), .
 The Ethics of Competition: How a Competitive Society is Good for All. Cheltenham: Elgar 2019, .
 The Honorable Merchant – Between Modesty and Risk-Taking: Intercultural and Literary Aspects, Heidelberg/New York: Springer 2019, (ed., with C. Strosetzki), .
 The Idea of Justice in Literature, Heidelberg/New York: Springer 2018, (ed., with H. Kabashima, S. Liu, A. de Prada Garcia), .
 Order Ethics: An Ethical Framework for the Social Market Economy, Heidelberg/New York: Springer 2016, (ed., with N. Mukerji), .
 Order Ethics or Moral Surplus: What Holds a Society Together?, Lanham: Lexington 2015, .
 Experimental Ethics: Toward an Empirical Moral Philosophy, Basingstoke: Palgrave Macmillan 2014, (ed., with H. Rusch and M. Uhl), .
 Ethik des Wettbewerbs: Über Konkurrenz und Moral. München: Beck 2014, .
 Business Ethics and Risk Management, Heidelberg/New York: Springer 2014, (ed., with J. Jauernig), .
 Handbook of the Philosophical Foundations of Business Ethics. Heidelberg/New York: Springer 2013 (ed.), .
 Einführung in die Wirtschaftsethik. 3rd ed., Münster: LIT 2013 (with K. Homann), .
 Wirtschaftsethik ohne Illusionen: Ordnungstheoretische Reflexionen. Tübingen: Mohr Siebeck 2012, .
 Entscheidung und Urteil. Göttingen: Vandenhoeck und Ruprecht 2009 (with H. Jungermann), .
 Corporate Citizenship, Contractarianism and Ethical Theory: On Philosophical Foundations of Business Ethics. Aldershot/London: Ashgate 2008 (ed., with J. Conill and T. Schönwälder-Kuntze), .
 Globalisation and Business Ethics. Aldershot/London: Ashgate 2007 (ed., with K. Homann and P. Koslowski), .
 Was hält eine Gesellschaft zusammen? Ethik im Zeitalter der Globalisierung. Tübingen: Mohr Siebeck 2007, .
 Ökonomische Wissenschaftstheorie. Würzburg: Königshausen und Neumann 2001, .

References

External links
 Christoph Lütge's Homepage at TU Munich
 Institute for Ethics in Artificial Intelligence 

21st-century German philosophers
German economists
German ethicists
Artificial intelligence ethicists
People from Helmstedt
Technical University of Braunschweig alumni
Academic staff of the Technical University of Braunschweig
Academic staff of the Technical University of Munich
Living people
1969 births